Calvin Demba is an English actor, writer and director. He is best known for his roles in Youngers and Life.

Early life
Demba was born and raised in East London. From the age of 17, Demba attended The Half Moon youth theatre in Limehouse, before signing with an acting agency in Hoxton.

Career
Demba first came to prominence in 2011, when he was cast as Scott Sabeka in the Channel 4 soap Hollyoaks. Demba stayed in the role for a year, filming 82 episodes as Sabeka.

In 2013, Demba made his theatrical debut, in the play Routes, portraying Kola. The play was staged at the Royal Court Theatre in London.

From 2013-2014, Demba portrayed Jay in the E4 comedy-drama series Youngers. In an interview with The National Student, Demba shared, "I’m hoping shows like this will open up the doors for more young black actors and this will be good for that reason alone. It conveys young people in a positive way and as goal-orientated which is not always done. There are no drug references, no sex and not even any swearing. I feel like we’re going in the right direction with this because it shows we’re not all drug-taking people without hope. There are diamonds in the rough."

In 2015, Demba was nominated for the Evening Standard 'Emerging Talent' Award for his performance in Patrick Marber's The Red Lion at the National Theatre, London.

In 2020, Demba starred as Andy Okonkwo in the BBC drama Life, alongside Alison Steadman, Victoria Hamilton and Adrian Lester.

In 2022, Demba wrote and directed short film, Babydolls, which was his directing debut, and a project backed by the BFI. Demba was one of four writers honoured at the 2022 Film London Lodestars; the ceremony honours innovative creators and practitioners to watch.

Demba is featured in the upcoming Netflix drama series, Supacell.

Credits

Filmography

References

Living people
British television actors
British film actors
Year of birth missing (living people)